The thamnornis or thamnornis warbler (Thamnornis chloropetoides) is a species of Malagasy warbler in the family Bernieridae.
It is found only in Madagascar.

Its natural habitats are subtropical or tropical dry forests and subtropical or tropical dry shrubland.

References

 del Hoyo, J.; Elliot, A. & Christie D. (editors). (2006). Handbook of the Birds of the World. Volume 11: Old World Flycatchers to Old World Warblers. Lynx Edicions. .

Malagasy warblers
Monotypic bird genera
Birds described in 1867
Taxonomy articles created by Polbot